The MI 79 (French: Matériel d'Interconnexion de 1979, English: interconnection rolling stock of 1979), also known as the Class Z 8100 is a dual-voltage electric multiple unit trainset that is operated on line B of the Réseau Express Régional (RER), a hybrid suburban commuter and rapid transit system serving Paris and its suburbs. The MI 79, designed in the 1970s for the RER B which needed dual-voltage (interconnection) trainsets. They were followed by a derivative version, the MI 84, designed in the 1980s to meet the needs of the RER A line, before reassigned to the RER B in the 2010s.

History 
In the early 1970s, work was underway to create the Réseau Express Régional (RER), a hybrid suburban commuter and rapid transit system serving Paris and its suburbs. The RER B line would be created by connecting two existing lines with a new tunnel that would run from north to south through the heart of Paris.

This proposed line presented some complications.

The solution was a train capable of using both electrification networks ("interconnecting") with a pneumatically controlled exterior step that would stay at floor height at high platform stations and would be automatically lowered when entering low platform stations.

As the SNCF and RATP would jointly operate the RER B, the agencies also jointly ordered the MI 79. The contract to build the trainsets was awarded in 1979 to Alsthom and Société Franco-Belge (which would be acquired by Alsthom in 1982, before the completion of the order). The initial order, called the MI 79A, would be for a total of 72 four-car trainsets: 31 to be purchased by RATP and 51 to be purchased by SNCF. The first trainsets were rapidly assembled and the first trainsets arrived for testing in 1980. The RATP made an order for 38 additional trainsets to be called the MI 79B which incorporated several improvements, including simplification of the coupler system, changes to the brake control system, and simplification of door controls. All of the trainsets would be delivered by 1985.

Although the trains were needed to enable the interconnection of the RER B, technical issues with the MS 61, forced RATP to transfer 24 MI 79 trainsets from the RER B to the RER A to make up for a shortfall in equipment. An issue with the MI 79 was discovered during a cold wave in 1985–86, electrical components and motors did not have enough insulation. The retirement of the Z 23000 railcars dating from 1938 was postponed to make up for the shortfall in equipment caused by MI 79 trainsets sidelined with frost issues.

A trainset was damaged in the 1995 France bombings and another was damaged in the 1996 Paris RER bombing. The undamaged trailer and motor cars from these sets were later combined.

The MI 79 trainsets underwent a major refurbishment project between 2010 and 2015 at a cost of €275 million.

Design 

As delivered, the MI 79 had an interior design in keeping with the aesthetics of the time, including red and blue vinyl seats, cream-colored ceilings, yellow side walls, and dark blue end walls. Also, because the RER B would serve Charles de Gaulle Airport, trains were equipped with luggage racks above the seats.

One of the design choices that would later present a problem was the flip-down seats near the entry doors.

The trainsets are light for their size and era of construction thanks to the use of aluminum for the body. Each four-car trainset is equipped with eight motors (one on motor per axle on the power cars) developing a total of  under DC power and  under AC power. That combination of low weight and high power allows the MI 79 to fully depart from a 208-meter platform in 23 seconds and reaching their  top speed in 100 seconds.

Technical details 
Each MI 79 trainset is made up of four cars with two motorized cars flanking two non-powered trailer cars. Because the pantograph is located on the trailer car, each motorized car and trailer car are like a married pair, and together act as an independent half-trainset.

Each motorized car has four motors (two per bogie) manufactured for Alstom by a joint venture of CEM and Oerlikon. Designated the EHO 3262 A, these direct current (DC) motors are cooled by air and each develops . They are positioned suspended on the bogie frame. The power control system uses an analog TCO chopper with thyristors. When overhead lines supply AC power, a rectifier is used to convert the power into DC.

The braking system includes disc, dynamic, and eddy current brakes. When the train is being supplied DC power, the dynamic brakes are regenerative, returning power to the overhead lines. Under AC, the dynamic brakes are rheostatic, with the power dissipated as heat in the brake grid resistors.

Formations 
, 68 MI 79 trainsets were based at the Massy RATP depot and 48 trainsets were based at the Mitry SNCF depot.

The trainsets are formed as shown below, with two motored cars and two non-powered trailer cars.(2M2T)

 < or > show a pantograph. Cars 2 and 3 were each equipped with one type AM 62 BU pantograph.
 Car 2 was formerly a mixed 1st class and 2nd class car

Refurbishment 

A significant renovation of both interior and exterior of 119 MI 79 trains of the RER B took place between 2010 and 2015. The  project included a technical update, installation of refrigerated ventilation, and changes to the interior layout of the cars. The refurbishment program is expected to extend the life of the trainsets for 15 to 20 years.

After a prototype renovation by Alstom at their site in Reichshoffen, the remaining renovations are carried out in the RATP workshops in Sucy-en-Brie. At the end of 2013, 58 trainsets had been renovated, 75 in mid-2014, 100 in June 2015 and the last in December 2015.

In September 2011, an investigation detected asbestos residue in the newly refurbished trainsets. Of the 60 cars that were inspected, 32 to 36 contained asbestos. These trainsets were withdrawn from service, reducing the number of trains on the line by 20%.

The interior layout of the cars was revised during the refurbishment. One major change was the elimination of the overhead luggage shelves which prevented heating and ventilation ducts from being installed on the ceiling of the cars and were only lightly used by passengers. Instead, a block of four seats was removed to add a luggage rack near the doors. The problematic flip down seats by the doors were also removed and replaced with lean bars.

The interior also received better lighting, more grab bars for standing passengers, and saw the elimination of interior dividers. A passenger information system (SISVE) was also installed, which provides audio announcements and visual display of the trains next stop with available connections.

Gallery

References

External links

Electric multiple units of France
Réseau Express Régional multiple units
MI79
Train-related introductions in 1981
25 kV AC multiple units
Alstom multiple units
1500 V DC multiple units of France